David Jansen (born 4 December 1987) is a German footballer who plays for Swiss club FC Naters.

References

External links

David Jansen at Fupa

1987 births
Living people
German footballers
FSV Oggersheim players
SV Elversberg players
SC Paderborn 07 players
Rot-Weiß Oberhausen players
Chemnitzer FC players
2. Bundesliga players
3. Liga players
Regionalliga players
Association football forwards
People from Würselen
Sportspeople from Cologne (region)
Footballers from North Rhine-Westphalia